423 Maritime Helicopter Squadron is a unit of the Canadian Forces under Royal Canadian Air Force. It currently operates the Sikorsky CH-148 Cyclone from CFB Shearwater in Nova Scotia, Canada.

History
No. 423 Squadron RCAF was a World War II unit of the Royal Canadian Air Force. Formed in 1942 in Oban, Argyll, Scotland for General Reconnaissance duties, it later moved to RAF Castle Archdale, Northern Ireland where it flew Sunderland flying boat patrol bombers. It changed to a transport role in 1945 and was disbanded later that year. Re-formed in 1953 at RCAF Station St Hubert (now Montréal/Saint-Hubert Airport) flying the CF-100 in a continental defence role, it was transferred to RCAF Station Grostenquin in 1957 where it replaced No. 416 Squadron which flew Sabres. The squadron was again disbanded in 1962 when the RCAF's CF-100s were removed from service. In 1974, it was re-formed a final time as No. 423 Anti-Submarine Squadron. In 1995 its name was changed to 423 Maritime Helicopter Squadron. It flew CH-124 Sea King helicopter, which it used in support of Royal Canadian Navy (RCN) warships during the 1991 Gulf War and in the Arabian Sea after the 11 September 2001 terrorist attacks.  It now operates the Sikorsky CH-148 Cyclone since January 2018.

All six crew members aboard the aircraft were killed.

References

 No.423 (MH) Squadron Royal Canadian Air Force Shearwater Sep. 1974 – Present Retrieved April 2, 2016 
 423 Squadron History Retrieved April 2, 2016
 Canadian Wings - No. 423 Squadron Retrieved April 2, 2016 
Canadian Department of National Defence - Honours & Recognition for the Men and Women of the Canadian Armed Forces 10th Edition - 2016.  Accessed 14 March 2019

External links
 

Canadian Forces aircraft squadrons
Royal Canadian Air Force squadrons
Military units and formations established in 1942
Military units and formations disestablished in 1945
Military units and formations established in 1953
Military units and formations disestablished in 1962
Military units and formations established in 1974